Liam Donoghue (born September 1974) is an Irish sportsperson who plays hurling with his local club Clarinbridge. He played on the Galway senior inter-county team from 2003 until 2006.

Early life

Liam Donoghue was born in Clarinbridge, County Galway in 1974. Educated at Killeeneen National School and Athenry Vocational School.

Playing career

Club

Donoghue plays his club hurling with Clarinbridge. He won numerous underage titles at club level, an All Ireland Minor medal in 1992 and was sub goalkeeper on the U-21 All Ireland winning team of 1993. Captained Clarinbridge in their inaugural Senior County Final appearance in 1997, and was man of the match when they won their first ever Galway Senior Hurling Championship title against Athenry in 2001. Later that year Donoghue won a Connacht club hurling title, however, his side were defeated by Birr in the All-Ireland club final.
All-Ireland glory finally  arrived in 2011 when Clarinbridge won county and club All-Ireland honours, defeating Oloughlin Gaels on St. Patricks in Croke Park.

Inter-county
After his involvement in the successful minor and U-21 teams of the early 1990s, it was expected that he would be an automatic choice to join the Galway senior team. However, the goalkeeping position went to Morgan Darcy. Donoghue turned to association football after this. He played with Kiltulla F.C. and helped the team reach the quarter-finals of the FAI Junior Cup. Over the course of the whole season Donoghue scored a remarkable forty goals. He later joined Galway United and, although he never played in the League of Ireland, he regularly lined out in the Connacht Senior League.

In 2001 Donoghue joined the Galway senior hurling panel, and was sub goalkeeper when Galway were defeated by Tipperary in the All Ireland Final of that year. In 2003 Donoghue returned to the Galway senior team as the first-choice goalkeeper. Won a National League Title in 2004, and was appointed captain in 2005, steering his native-county to an All-Ireland final showdown with Cork, however, Galway lost the game by four points. He was named team captain again for the 2006 team.

In 2007 Donoghue was dropped from the Galway panel by the new manager, Ger Loughnane.

References 

1974 births
Living people
Clarinbridge hurlers
Galway inter-county hurlers
Connacht inter-provincial hurlers
Hurling goalkeepers
Galway United F.C. (1937–2011) players
Association footballers from County Galway
Republic of Ireland association footballers
Association footballers not categorized by position